"Long Live the Night" is a song recorded by Canadian country duo the Reklaws. The track was co-written by duo member Stuart Walker with Travis Wood and the track's producer Todd Clark. The song was released on a three-track EP of the same name, and became the second single off the Reklaws' debut album Freshman Year.

Critical reception
Sterling Whitaker of Taste of Country said the Reklaws "captured the perfect country party vibe" on "Long Live the Night". He stated: "Up-tempo acoustic guitar strumming underpins the track from the start, but the Reklaws fuse some fairly traditional elements with a contemporary sheen. All of it supports a singalong melody that is instantly addictive ear candy. The lyrics to "Long Live the Night" celebrate having a good time while you can, before the sun comes up." Building Our Own Nashville called the song "very anthemic country pop song with great vocals” that is "hard not to sing along with".

Commercial performance
"Long Live the Night" was certified Platinum by Music Canada on August 21, 2019, with over 80,000 sales. It reached a peak of #6 on the Billboard Canada Country chart dated June 30, 2018 becoming their first Top 10 hit. It also peaked at #25 on the Billboard Hot Canadian Digital Singles chart on December 18, 2018. According to Nielsen BDS, "Long Live the Night" was the second most-played song by a domestic artist on Canadian country radio in 2018 after James Barker Band's "Good Together".

In popular culture
A modified version of "Long Live the Night" was made for the Canadian Football League and used as the theme song for the national TV broadcast Thursday Night Football on CFL on TSN in 2018 and 2019.

Music video
The official music video for "Long Live the Night" premiered on May 17, 2018, and was directed by Ben Knechtel.

Live performance
In November 2018, the Reklaws performed "Long Live the Night" at the kickoff show for the 106th Grey Cup in Edmonton.

Track listings
Radio single
 "Long Live the Night" – 3:26

Digital download - EP
 "Long Live the Night" – 3:26
 "Last Call" – 2:58
 "Wish You Were Beer" – 3:46(feat. James Barker Band)

Charts

Certifications

References

2018 songs
2018 singles
The Reklaws songs
Universal Music Canada singles
Songs written by Todd Clark
Songs written by Stuart Walker (singer)
Songs written by Travis Wood (songwriter)
Song recordings produced by Todd Clark